Johnny Boyd (August 19, 1926 – October 27, 2003) was an American racecar driver.

Racing career
Born in Fresno, California, Boyd drove in the AAA and USAC Championship Car series from 1954 to 1966 with 56 starts.  He finished in the top ten 31 times, with his best finish in 2nd position, in 1959 at Milwaukee.

Boyd qualified for the Indianapolis 500 for the first time in 1955 but finished 29th after being involved in an accident that killed driver Bill Vukovich.  In a dozen starts, his best race was in 1958, when he led 18 laps and finished 3rd.  In total, he finished in the Top 10 at the 500 five times.

After 1949 Boyd had become close friends with Bob Sweikert of Hayward, California when he met him on the California racing circuit. The two often raced together, and Boyd qualified for entry in the 1955 Indianapolis 500 when Sweikert helped him overcome mechanical handling problems in Boyd's car. Sweikert won the race that day, but was overshadowed by the death of Vukovich. Boyd also raced against Sweikert in 1956 at Indy, but Sweikert was killed several weeks later in a Sprint car race.

Boyd retired as a driver after failing to qualify for the Indy 500 and Milwaukee race in 1967.  He died of cancer at age 77 in his hometown of Fresno.

Awards
In 1966, Boyd was inducted into the Fresno County Athletic Hall of Fame. He was named to the National Midget Auto Racing Hall of Fame in 2010.

Indianapolis 500 results

Complete Formula One World Championship results
(key)

References

External links
1950s, '60s Indianapolis 500 Contender Boyd Dies At 77

1926 births
2003 deaths
Indianapolis 500 drivers
Racing drivers from Fresno, California
Sportspeople from Fresno, California
Racing drivers from California